is a former Japanese football player. He played for Japan national team.

Club career
Kawano was born in Nakatsu on July 11, 1945. After graduating from Tokyo University of Education, he joined Toyo Industries in 1968. The club won the league championships in 1968 and 1970. The club also won the 1969 Emperor's Cup. He retired in 1976. He played 90 games and scored 8 goals in the league.

National team career
On March 31, 1968, Kawano debuted for the Japan national team against Australia. In October 1969, he was also selected by Japan for the 1970 World Cup qualification. He played two games for Japan until 1969.

National team statistics

References

External links
 
 Japan National Football Team Database

1945 births
Living people
University of Tsukuba alumni
Association football people from Ōita Prefecture
Japanese footballers
Japan international footballers
Japan Soccer League players
Sanfrecce Hiroshima players
Association football defenders